Blanc-Sablon is the easternmost community in Le Golfe-du-Saint-Laurent Regional County Municipality, in the administrative région of Côte-Nord, in the province of Quebec, Canada. With a population of 1,122 inhabitants in 2021, it is the most populous community in the county municipality.

History 

The place was already known to early European explorers who may have named it after the fine white sand of the eponymous bay (blanc means "white", whereas sablon is the diminutive form of sable meaning "sand"). Or it may be named after Blancs-Sablons Cove in Saint-Malo, home town of Jacques Cartier, who landed at the place in 1534 and set up a cross near the current site of Lourdes-de-Blanc-Sablon.

During the 16th and 17th centuries, Basque and Portuguese fishermen seasonally frequented the area. In 1704, Augustin Le Gardeur de Courtemanche, landlord of the lower Côte-Nord at that time, built Fort Pontchartrain at the current location of Brador. Permanent settlement did not begin until the 19th century with the arrival of French-Canadians, Acadians, and Jersey settlers. In 1858, the Mission of Longue-Pointe-de-Blanc-Sablon was established and took the name Lourdes-de-Blanc-Sablon or Notre-Dame-de-Lourdes at the end of 19th century. In 1884, the post office opened.

The area was first incorporated in 1963 as part of the Municipality of Côte-Nord-du-Golfe-du-Saint-Laurent, but separated on January 1, 1990, and became the Municipality of Blanc-Sablon.

Fifty hectares of land in Blanc-Sablon were designated a National Historic Site of Canada in 2007, as they contain over 60 archaeological sites relating to 9000 years of human occupation, including the Archaic, Dorset and European periods.

Geography
Blanc-Sablon is located on the north coast of the Gulf of Saint Lawrence near the entrance of the Strait of Belle Isle. Two significant bays, Brador and Blanc-Sablon, mark its shores and the headland that separates these bays is dominated by Mont Parent, a 100-metre (328 ft) high flat-topped hill named after Martin Parent, a local fisherman in the middle of the 19th century. The municipality borders Côte-Nord-du-Golfe-du-Saint-Laurent to the south-west, and L'Anse-au-Clair, Labrador, to the north-east.

The estuary of the Brador River and Blanc-Sablon River has a lagoon designated barachois, separated from the sea by sand or gravel. Seawater enters at high tide.

The Blanc-Sablon archipelago is located off the coasts of the villages of Blanc-Sablon and Brador and includes Long Island, Lazy Island, Basin Island, Island of the Parrots, Wood Island and Greenly, housing the Bird Sanctuary of Brador Bay.

The municipality of Blanc-Sablon has several land protrusions into the Gulf of St. Lawrence; from east to west, they are Point Saint-Charles, Morel's Point, Lazy Point, Hunting Point, "À la Barque" Point, Cape Crow and Point Jones.

Climate
Blanc-Sablon experiences a subarctic climate (Köppen climate classification Dfc). Although its latitude is only 51 degrees north, and its climate is tempered by the Atlantic Ocean, it experiences a much colder climate than other localities at the same latitude due to the cold Labrador Current.

Communities 

The municipality includes three villages: Blanc-Sablon, Lourdes-de-Blanc-Sablon, and Brador Bay.

Blanc-Sablon 
Blanc-Sablon is located about one kilometer east of Lourdes-de-Blanc-Sablon directly on the Blanc-Sablon Bay. It had a population of 116 in 2016. The wharf and the ferry to St. Barbe, Newfoundland and Labrador are located in the town.

Lourdes-de-Blanc-Sablon

Lourdes-de-Blanc-Sablon is the largest community in the municipality, and is located on the headland that separates Brador Bay from Blanc-Sablon Bay. It was originally known as Longue-Pointe (Long Point) until the beginning of the 20th century. It has a small natural harbour, and long depended on the fishing business.

Brador
While known in the 18th century as Fort Pontchartrain and Phélipeaux Bay, its current name is the shortened form of Labrador. In French, the syllable la is a definite article, and in documents from the 17th and 18th century, this syllable was considered as such and separated from the rest of the name. François Martel de Brouague, the King's Commander of this region from 1714 to 1760, referred to this location as: "A la Baye de Phélipeaux, coste de la Brador" ("At the Bay of Phélipeaux, coast of the Brador").

Demographics

Population

Language

Transport

Ferry services 

Being at the eastern end of the Côte-Nord region, Blanc-Sablon is served by a ferry for the communities along the north shore of the Gulf of St. Lawrence, connecting with the coastal communities of Saint-Augustin, Gros-Mécatina, Tête-à-la-Baleine, Harrington Harbour, La Romaine and Kegashka, as well as Anticosti Island at Port-Menier. This service is funded by the Government of Quebec. The ferry service's main goal is to make up for the  gap in Route 138, which remains unbuilt between Kegaska and Old Fort (in Bonne-Espérance).

Blanc-Sablon is also the northern terminus of a ferry service across the Strait of Belle Isle to the island of Newfoundland, mainly serving as a connection with nearby Labrador. During winter months, ice conditions sometimes require the service to divert to Corner Brook instead of St. Barbe.

Road access 

At present, Blanc-Sablon is inaccessible directly via the rest of the Quebec road network. From the west, Route 138 has been built to the village of Kegashka; then following a  gap, a  segment restarts at the village of Old Fort and continues to Blanc-Sablon, ending at the border with Labrador near L'Anse-au-Clair where it becomes the Trans-Labrador Highway (Route 510).

The Quebec government annually plans, invests and works towards connecting Quebec with Labrador via Blanc-Sablon with the completion of Route 138.

Air travel

The Lourdes-de-Blanc-Sablon Airport provides scheduled air service to Blanc-Sablon.

Education
Centre de services scolaire du Littoral operates:
 Mgr-Scheffer School (anglophone and francophone) in Lourdes-de-Blanc-Sablon
  St-Theresa School (for adults) in Blanc-Sablon

See also
 Border between Quebec and Newfoundland and Labrador
 List of municipalities in Quebec

References

External links

Blanc-Sablon tourist information page

Municipalities in Quebec
Incorporated places in Côte-Nord
Hudson's Bay Company trading posts
Designated places in Quebec
Road-inaccessible communities of Quebec
Populated coastal places in Canada